The 2015 Australian Swimming Championships were held from 3 to 10 April 2015 at the Sydney Olympic Park Aquatic Centre in Sydney, New South Wales. They doubled up as the national trials for the 2015 World Aquatics Championships in Kazan, Russia, the 2015 Summer Universiade, held in Gwangju, South Korea, the 2015 IPC Swimming World Championships, held in Glasgow, Scotland and the 2015 FINA World Junior Swimming Championships, held in Singapore.

Events
A total of 63 events (32 for men and 31 for women) were contested:
Freestyle: 50, 100, 200, 400, 800, and 1,500;
Backstroke: 50, 100 and 200;
Breaststroke: 50, 100 and 200;
Butterfly: 50, 100 and 200;
Individual medley: 200 and 400;
Relays: 4×100 free, 4×200 free; 4×100 medley

Schedule

M = Morning session, E = Evening session

Qualification criteria

Below are the entry qualifying times for each event that had to be achieved after 1 January 2014 in a 50m pool.

Below are the FINA A and B qualifying times for the 2015 World Aquatics Championships for each event.

Below are the qualifying times set by Swimming Australia for the 2015 World Aquatics Championships for each event.

Below are the men's entry multiclass qualifying times for each event.

Below are the women's entry multiclass qualifying times for each event.

Below are the IPC minimum qualification standard (MQS) and minimum entry times (MET) for the 2015 IPC Swimming World Championships for each event.

Medal winners

Men's events

Men's multiclass events

Women's events

Women's multiclass events

Legend:

References

Swimming Championships
Australian championships
Australian Swimming Championships
Sports competitions in Sydney
April 2015 sports events in Australia